The Castle of Fu Manchu is a 1969 film and the fifth and final Dr. Fu Manchu film with Christopher Lee portraying the title character.

Plot
Supercriminal Dr. Fu Manchu plots to freeze the world's oceans with a diabolical new device. With his beautiful but evil daughter, Lin Tang, his army of dacoits, and the help of the local crime organization led by Omar Pasha (whom Dr. Fu Manchu double-crosses), Dr. Fu Manchu takes over the governor's castle in Istanbul, which has a massive opium reserve, to control the largest opium port in Anatolia, since the drug is an important ingredient for the fuel for his machine. Dr. Fu Manchu needs the help of an intelligent scientist with an ailing heart whom he has imprisoned. In order to keep the scientist alive, he kidnaps a doctor and his wife to give the scientist a heart transplant from one of his obedient servants. Opposing him from Britain's branch of Interpol are his nemeses, Nayland Smith and Dr. Petrie.

Cast

Christopher Lee as Fu Manchu
Tsai Chin as Lin Tang
Maria Perschy as Dr. Ingrid Koch
Richard Greene as Nayland Smith
Howard Marion-Crawford as Dr. Petrie
Günther Stoll as Dr. Curt Kessler
Rosalba Neri as Lisa
José Manuel Martín as Omar Pasha
Werner Aprelat as Melnik
Uncredited:
Mike Brendel as Pasha's Gunman
Jesús Franco as Inspector Hamid
Herbert Fux as Governor
Osvaldo Genazzani as Sir Robert
Burt Kwouk as Feng 
Gustavo Re as Professor Heracles
Gene Reyes as Hamid's Aide
Moisés Augusto Rocha as Fu's Henchman

Home media
Blue Underground released the film on DVD under The Christopher Lee Collection in 2003.

In popular culture
In 1992, The Castle of Fu Manchu was featured in Mystery Science Theater 3000 (Season 3, Episode 23). Towards the end, Joel comments that Roger Ebert liked the movie; however, in 1993 Ebert stated he had "never seen it." The episode marked the closest Joel and the Bots came to losing their sanity due to the poor quality of the movie.

See also
A Night to Remember-Titanic sinking scene used for this movie 
List of films considered the worst

References

External links

 
 MST3K episode on ShoutFactoryTV
 AllMovie

1969 films
West German films
Italian horror films
Spanish horror films
English-language German films
English-language Italian films
English-language Spanish films
Films based on British novels
Films directed by Jesús Franco
Films about organ transplantation
Films set in castles
Films set in the 1920s
Films set in Istanbul
Fu Manchu films
1960s English-language films
German horror films
Italian crime drama films
Spanish crime drama films
German crime drama films
1960s Italian films
1960s German films